Rangewood is a suburb of Townsville in the City of Townsville, Queensland, Australia.

History 
The suburb was named and bounded on 28 February 2003.

Geography
The Hervey Range Developmental Road runs along the southern boundary.

References

External links 

 

Suburbs of Townsville